Shandor Oleksandrovych Vayda (born 14 December 1991) is a Ukrainian professional footballer who plays as a midfielder for Hungarian club Mezőkövesd.

Vayda is the product of the different Zakarpattia Oblast sportive schools. His first trainer was Ivan Bilak.

References

External links

1991 births
Ukrainian people of Hungarian descent
Living people
Ukrainian footballers
Association football midfielders
FC Hoverla Uzhhorod players
FC Stal Kamianske players
SC Beregvidek Berehove players
FC Naftovyk-Ukrnafta Okhtyrka players
FC Cherkashchyna players
Balmazújvárosi FC players
Mezőkövesdi SE footballers
Ukrainian First League players
Ukrainian Second League players
Nemzeti Bajnokság I players
Nemzeti Bajnokság II players
Ukrainian expatriate footballers
Expatriate footballers in Hungary
Ukrainian expatriate sportspeople in Hungary